Dominika Brzeska (born 2004) is a Polish slalom canoeist who has competed at the international level since 2019.

She won a bronze medal in the K1 team event at the 2022 World Championships in Augsburg. She also won a bronze medal in the K1 team event at the 2022 European Championships in Liptovský Mikuláš.

References

External links

Living people
Polish female canoeists
2004 births
Medalists at the ICF Canoe Slalom World Championships
21st-century Polish women